Adisorn Vitsudhamakul (born 1 April 1939) is a Thai sprinter. He competed in the men's 4 × 400 metres relay at the 1964 Summer Olympics.

References

1939 births
Living people
Athletes (track and field) at the 1964 Summer Olympics
Adisorn Vitsudhamakul
Adisorn Vitsudhamakul
Place of birth missing (living people)